Vicens or Vicéns is a surname. Notable people with the surname include:

Antonio J. Vicéns (born 1947), Puerto Rican military officer
Enrique A. Vicéns (born 1943), Puerto Rican politician
Jaume Vicéns i Vives (1910–1960), Spanish historian
Josefina Vicens (1911–1988), Mexican writer
Juan "Pachín" Vicéns (1934–2007), Puerto Rican basketball player
Rafael Antonio "Feyo" Vicéns Torresola (1920-2010) Farmer, teacher, Cooperative Movement leader, photographer from Jayuya

See also
Casa Vicéns, residence in Barcelona, Spain
Auditorio Juan Pachín Vicéns, sports venue in Puerto Rico

Catalan-language surnames